Muhammad Hafizul Hakim bin Khairul Nizam Jothy (born 30 March 1993) is a Malaysian professional footballer who plays for the Malaysia national team as a goalkeeper.

Early life
Hafizul was born on 30 March 1993 in Klinik Bhajan, Medan Gopeng, Ipoh, Perak. Hafizul is the first of 2 siblings. Hafizul got his early education in St. Michael's Institution in Ipoh, Perak. During his school days, he played as a midfielder but his interest started to be a goalkeeper during high school days. Back then, Hafizul never represented at any levels in football.

Club career

Youth
Hafizul began his career in Perak's youth system, known as Perak FA President and Youth team during the 2010–2014 season. In 2013, he went to Harimau Muda B selection and was selected to represent the team in 2013 S.League. After one season with Harimau Muda B, Hafizul returned to Perak's youth system. Hafizul played in 2014 Sukma Games representing Perak. Their team won the gold medal after beating Johor 3–1 in the final at the Tuanku Syed Putra Stadium, Kangar, Perlis.

Melaka United
In 2015, Hafizul signed one-year deal with the third-tier team Melaka United in Malaysia FAM League and helped the team in their successful quest for promotion to 2016 Malaysia Premier League. Hafizul played in the last match of the season against Young Fighters on 24 August 2015.

Perak
In December 2015, Hafizul was announced to play for Perak in the 2016 season. Hafizul made his Super League debut on 14 February 2016, keeping a clean sheet in a 0–0 draw over Kelantan at the Perak Stadium. Due to the injury suffered by the regular custodian Zamir Selamat, Hafizul has been entrusted as the goalkeeper for 2016 season. His best performance winning plaudits from coaches and media and he was included in the FourFourTwo's Malaysia Super League 2016 Team of the month for February. Hafizul made 19 league appearances 7 clean sheets during his debut season.

Hafizul made his first appearance of the 2017 season as the first start in Perak's opening Super League match in a 1–1 draw against Pahang at home on 21 January 2017. Hafizul made all 22 league matches with 7 clean sheets.

In 2018 season, he was appointed as Perak co-vice captain together with Shahrul Saad.

Penang
On 17 December 2021, Hafizul completed his transfer to Penang for an undisclosed contract.

International career
On 25 August 2016, Hafizul received his first call-up to the Malaysia national team for a friendly game with Indonesia on 6 September 2016 in Manahan Stadium, Solo. However he did not play in the game and was on the bench.

On 15 November 2016, Hafizul was selected in Malaysia's 23-man squad for the 2016 AFF Championship. As third-choice goalkeeper behind Khairul Fahmi and Khairul Azhan, Hafizul was not to feature at that AFF Championship, in which Malaysia were eliminated in the group stage.

On 22 March 2017, Hafizul made his debut for Malaysia coming off the bench against Philippines in a 0–0 draw on the friendly game.

His international first start came in a 1–0 defeat to Myanmar on 29 August 2017 on the friendly game.

On 5 September 2017, Hafizul produced a last minute penalty save against Hong Kong to help the team to gain their first point in the 2019 Asian Cup qualification round with the score ended 1–1 draw.

Sponsorship
Hafizul received a personal sponsorship to wear Uhlsport goalkeeping gloves.

Career statistics

Club

International

Honours

Club
Melaka United
Malaysia FAM League: 2015
Perak
 Malaysia Super League: Runner-up 2018 
 Malaysia Cup: 2018, Runner-up 2019

International
Malaysia
 AFF Championship: Runner-up 2018

References

External links
 
 

1993 births
Living people
Malaysian footballers
Perak F.C. players
Melaka United F.C. players
People from Perak
Malaysia Super League players
Malaysia international footballers
Association football goalkeepers